Ali Tehrani (born Ali Moradkhani Arangeh, ; 25 April 1926 – 19 October 2022), also known as Sheikh Ali Tehrani, was an Iranian Shia Islamic theologian and writer. He served as the representative of Khorasan Province in the Assembly of Experts for Constitution. 

During his youth, he fought the Pahlavi Dynasty and was arrested, put in jail and sent to exile by the regime. He was a Mujtahid and a disciple of Seyyed Hossein Borujerdi and Ruhollah Khomeini. After the Islamic Revolution and continuing his political career, he was sent to prison in Mashhad and was eventually released after months.
Tehrani then secretly fled from the state-imposed house arrest in March 1984 to Iraq. From there, he preached against the Islamic Republic and its rulers, in broadcasts by Baghdad's Farsi-speaking radio and television. He returned to Iran in 1995 and was sentenced to 20 years in prison but was released ten years later in 2005. His wife was Badri Khamenei, he was Seyyed Ali Khamenei's brother-in-law.

Tehrani died on 19 October 2022, at the age of 96.

References

1926 births
2022 deaths
20th-century Muslim theologians
Members of the Assembly of Experts for Constitution
Shia Islamists
People from Khorasan
Iranian expatriates in Iraq